İnicrliin Cave is a show cave located in Muğla Province, southwestern Turkey.

İncirliin Cave is situated in Gökçeler Canyon in Milas district of Muğla Province, Turkey. It is the most significant one and the only show cave in a group of nearly 30 caves in the canyon area. It is on the northern hillside of Mount Manastır overlooking the canyon. It is a horizontal lying spring cave. Its forming was affected by a distinctive fault in a karst formation. The cave has a wide entrance. It features  ponds, giant stalactites and stalagmites. There are many rooms separated from the main gallery by stalactites. The "Damlataş Galerisi" ("Dripstone Gallery") at the end of the show cave, which was formed on the fault, is situated  higher than the entrance level.

In terms of hydrogeology, the cave is in a vadose zone. It remains totally dry but becomes wet by dripping water from the cave ceiling during the rainy period. Generally, the stalactites and stalagmites in the entrance, the "Yarasa Galerisi" ("Bat Gallery"), the "Havuzlu Salon" ("Pond's Room") and the "Gösteri Salonu" are partially fossilized, while the formation of the stalactites, stalagmites, columns and draperies in the "Damlataş Galerisi" ("Dripstone Gallery") are still continuing.

A great number of earthenware pieces, which are dated back to the prehistoric era and antiquity,  were found in the ground at the entrance and inside the cave. By December 2016, archaeological excavations were started by the Muğla University in the section of the cave, which is not open to the public, Human and animal bones, stone tools and terracotta pieces were discovered. These finds show that the cave was inhabited in the ancient times already 8,000 years ago in 6000 BC.  İncirliin Cave was registered as a first-grade archaeological site and first-grade nature reserve on February 27, 2008. The cave was fitted in 2013 with lighting that does not harm geological formations. In April 2016, a -long part of the cave was opened to the public as a show cave.

References 

Show caves in Turkey
Landforms of Muğla Province
Tourist attractions in Muğla Province
Archaeological sites in the Aegean Region
Archaeological sites of prehistoric Anatolia
Archaeological sites of ancient Anatolia
Nature reserves in Turkey
Protected areas established in 2008
2008 establishments in Turkey